Kathryn J. Edin, is an American sociologist and a professor of sociology and public affairs at the Princeton School of Public and International Affairs at Princeton University. She specializes in the study of people living on welfare. Two of her books are Making ends meet: how single mothers survive welfare and low-wage work, and Promises I can keep: why poor women put motherhood before marriage.

Life and career
Edin graduated with a B.A. in sociology from North Park University in 1984. She then pursued graduate studies at Northwestern University, where she received a M.A. in sociology in 1988 and a Ph.D. in sociology in 1989 after completing a doctoral dissertation titled "There's a lot of month left at the end of the money: how welfare recipients in Chicago make ends meet." 

In February 2014, Edin was named a Bloomberg Distinguished Professor at Johns Hopkins University for her accomplishments as an interdisciplinary researcher and excellence in teaching the next generation of scholars.

Edin was elected as a member of the American Academy of Arts and Sciences in 2019.

Publications

Books
DeLuca, Stefanie, Susan Clampet-Lundquist and Kathryn Edin (2016). Coming of Age in the Other America. New York: Russell Sage Foundation. .
$2.00 a Day: Living on Almost Nothing in America (Houghton Mifflin Harcourt, 2015)
Edin, Kathryn and Timothy J. Nelson. Doing the Best I Can: Fatherhood in the Inner City. Berkeley: University of California Press, 2013. .
 
Edin, Kathryn, and Maria Kefalas. Promises I Can Keep: Why Poor Women Put Motherhood Before Marriage. Berkeley: University of California Press, 2005.  
Edin, Kathryn, and Laura Lein. Making Ends Meet: How Single Mothers Survive Welfare and Low-Wage Work. New York: Russell Sage Foundation, 1997 
Review, by  Sally Young Conrad;  Journal of Public Health Policy, 1997, vol. 18, no. 4, p. 480-484
Review, by  Susan Jacoby The New York Times book review. (May 4, 1997): 10
Review, by Ruth Sidel; The Women's Review of Books, Sep., 1997, vol. 14, no. 12, p. 27-28
Review, by Jane Waldfogel; Industrial and Labor Relations Review, Apr., 1998, vol. 51, no. 3, p. 529-530
Review, by  Erin L Kelly; Gender and Society, Aug., 1998, vol. 12, no. 4, p. 485-487
Review, by Ralph Da Costa Nunez Political Science Quarterly, Summer, 1998, vol. 113, no. 2, p. 350-351
Review, by Irma McClaurin: American Anthropologist. 100, no. 1, (1998): 231
Review, by Aldon Morris; Contemporary Sociology, Nov., 1998, vol. 27, no. 6, p. 564-566
Review, by Frances Fox Piven American Journal of Sociology, Mar., 1998, vol. 103, no. 5, p. 1461-1463
Review, by Elizabeth Cooksey  Population Studies, Mar., 2000, vol. 54, no. 1, p. 117-118

Peer-reviewed journal articles (selected)
Edin, Kathryn. 2000. "What Do Low-Income Single Mothers Say About Marriage?" Social Problems. 47, no. 1: 112-133.
Gibson-Davis, Christina M., Kathryn Edin, and Sara McLanahan. 2005. "High Hopes but Even Higher Expectations: The Retreat From Marriage Among Low-Income Couples". Journal of Marriage and Family. 67, no. 5: 1301-1312.
Laura Tach; Kathryn Edin "The Relationship Contexts of Young Disadvantaged Men" Annals of the American Academy of Political and Social Science, 635, no. 1 (2011): 76-94

Reports
Edin, Kathryn, Laura Lein, and Timothy Nelson. Low-Income, Non-Residential Fathers Off-Balance in a Competitive Economy, in Initial Analysis. Washington, D.C.: U.S. Dept. of Health and Human Services, 1998. OCLC 50199268 
Edin, Kathryn, Kathleen Mullan Harris, and Gary D. Sandefur. Welfare to Work: Opportunities and Pitfalls : Congressional Seminar, March 10, 1997. Washington, DC: Spivack Program in Applied Social Research and Social Policy, American Sociological Association, 1998.

References

External links

 Official p. at John F. Kennedy School of Government at Harvard University.
 What If Everything You Knew About Poverty Was Wrong? Researcher Kathryn Edin left the ivory tower for the streets of Camden—and turned sociology upside down. By Stephanie Mencimer, Mother Jones, March/April 2014. Detailed profile of Edin and her work. 

American Lutherans
Living people
Year of birth missing (living people)
Fellows of the American Academy of Arts and Sciences
American women sociologists
American sociologists
North Park University alumni
Northwestern University alumni
Princeton University faculty
20th-century American women writers
20th-century American non-fiction writers
21st-century American women writers
21st-century American non-fiction writers
Johns Hopkins University faculty